USS Rocket (AMc-101) was an Accentor-class coastal minesweeper acquired by the U.S. Navy for the dangerous task of removing mines from minefields laid in the water to prevent ships from passing.

Rocket a coastal minesweeper, was laid down 6 September 1941 by Anderson & Cristofani, San Francisco, California, launched 23 February 1942, sponsored by Mrs. N. Bruly of San Francisco; and placed in service 25 March 1942.

World War II service 
After shakedown along the California coast and training at the Local Defense School, Treasure Island, California, the new coastal minesweeper was assigned to the Western Sea Frontier Force. Transferred 16 March 1943 to the Naval Local Defense Force 12th Naval District, she continued her sweeps and patrols to protect San Francisco Harbor, a major departure point for men and materiel to the Pacific Ocean fighting fronts.

The war officially ended on 2 September and she was placed out of service 30 November 1945 and struck from the Navy list 3 January 1946. She was transferred to War Shipping Administration (WSA) for disposal 30 July 1946.

References

External links 
 NavSource Online: Mine Warfare Vessel Photo Archive - Rocket (AMc 101)

 

Accentor-class minesweepers
Ships built in San Francisco
1942 ships
World War II minesweepers of the United States